Ignota means "unknown", in the feminine form, in Latin, and is used in some contexts when the name of a person is unknown.

It may also refer to:
Elizabeth Clarke Wolstenholme Elmy who used it as a pseudonym
Plautia (mother of Aelius Caesar), sometimes called "Ignota Plautia"